Don Quixote is a 1976 sculpture by Aurelio Teno located at the northeast corner of the Kennedy Center in Washington, D.C. The sculpture of Don Quixote and his horse Rocinante was a gift from Spain for the United States Bicentennial. 

In 1993, the Smithsonian Institution's Save Outdoor Sculpture! program surveyed and assessed the work and found that it needed treatment.

Description

Don Quixote depicts a bronze and stone figure of Don Quixote wearing a full suit of armor riding his horse Rocinante which emerges from a jagged piece of stone. The jagged stone is Colmenar stone from Pamplona. Only the front portion of Don Quixote and his horse are visible. The horse appears to be charging forward out of the stone with his head raised, mouth open, and hooves kicking. The left foot of the horse is not formed, intentionally, by Teno. In Don Quixote's hand is a  lance of steel.

An inscription on the sculpture reads SCULPTOR / A. TENO / MADRID / ESPAÑA – 1976.

Acquisition

King Juan Carlos I and Queen Sofía presented the sculpture June 3, 1976, on behalf of Spain to the United States in honor of its bicentennial.

About the artist

Spanish artist Aurelio Teno started his professional sculpture career at age eight.  He described Don Quixote as his life's work, having devoted his career to creating art about the subject.

See also
 List of public art in Washington, D.C., Ward 2
 Statues of the Liberators

References

External links
 Don Quixote from dcMemorials.

1976 sculptures
Artworks in the collection of the National Park Service
Bronze sculptures in Washington, D.C.
Equestrian statues in Washington, D.C.
Sculptures of men in Washington, D.C.
Stone sculptures in Washington, D.C.
Works based on Don Quixote
1976 establishments in Washington, D.C.
Statues of fictional characters